Arla Foods amba is a Danish-Swedish multinational cooperative based in Viby, Denmark, and the largest producer of dairy products in Scandinavia, and the largest dairy in the United Kingdom.

Arla Foods was formed as the result of a merger between the Swedish dairy cooperative Arla and the Danish dairy company MD Foods on 17 April 2000. The name Arla derives from the same word as the English word 'early' and is an archaic Swedish term for 'early (in the morning)'.

History

Origins

In the 1880s, dairy farmers in Sweden and Denmark formed small cooperatives to invest in common dairy production facilities. The first cooperative dairy was established in Sweden at Stora Arla Gård in Västmanland in 1881 under the name of Arla Mejeriförening, and the first Danish cooperative dairy was established in Hjedding, outside Ølgod, Southern Jutland in 1882.

On 26 April 1915, dairy farmers in Stockholm and adjoining counties created Sweden's largest cooperative dairy organisation, Lantmännens mjölkförsäljningsförening (the Farmers' Milk Retail Association), which operated dairies as well as a chain of shops selling dairy products.

In 1927, the company registered the name Mjölkcentralen (The Milk Centre, shortened MC) and from the 1950s a growing number of cooperative dairies in other parts of Sweden began joining MC. In 1975, MC changed its name to Arla, a name previously used not only by Sweden's first cooperative dairy, but also by the largest dairy retailer in Gothenburg between 1909 and 1965.

By the end of the 20th century, Arla had a 65% market share in Sweden.

On 1 October 1970, Mejeriselskabet Danmark (MD) was established by four dairy companies and three individual dairies. In 1988, the company changed name to MD Foods. In 1992, MD Foods and Denmark's second largest dairy company, Kløver Mælk, signed a financially binding co operation agreement, and in 1999, the two companies merged to become MD Foods, gaining 90% of the Danish milk production.

In April 2000, MD Foods merged with Swedish Arla and formed Arla Foods A.m.b.A with headquarters in Aarhus, Denmark, and became Arla Foods as it is known today.

Current operations
Arla Foods is the fourth largest dairy company in the world with respect to milk volume, seventh with respect to turnover. At the start of 2016, 12,500 farmers across Western Europe and Scandinavia owned the cooperative.

Arla Foods has three minor brands: Arla, Lurpak and Castello cheeses that are sold worldwide. The Arla Brand is both a co operative brand and a brand across all product categories. The Lurpak brand of butter and spreads is owned by the Danish Dairy Board, and Castello is a cheese brand including blue cheese and yellow cheeses.

Arla Foods incorporated Arla Foods Ingredients, a former division, as an independent subsidiary in 2011. The company develops and manufactures milk based ingredients, primarily functional and nutritional milk proteins, bioactive phospholipids, minerals, permeate and lactose for the food industry.

The head office is located in Denmark. Arla Foods Ingredients has one wholly owned production plant in Denmark, with joint venture production at facilities in Argentina and Germany. In March 2011, Arla Foods and DMK formed the joint venture company ArNoCo GmbH & Co. KG, to produce whey proteins for the food industry. In February 2018, Arla Foods announced its plans to invest £70 million in the UK, as part of its strategy to secure long-term opportunities for its farmers across Europe. In October 2019, Arla Foods has invested an estimated €50 million (US$55 million) in a cheese production site in Bahrain. By 2025, Arla expects to increase annual production in Bahrain to more than 100,000 tons under its Puck, Arla, Dano, Kraft and Private Label brands.

2006 boycott 

Arla's sales were seriously affected by a two-month long boycott of Danish products in the Middle East in 2006. Anger among Muslims over satirical cartoons of Muhammed published in Denmark was the initial cause.

When the Danish government refused to condemn the cartoons or meet with eleven ambassadors from Muslim nations, a boycott of Danish products was organised, starting in Saudi Arabia and spreading across the Middle East. The Middle East is Arla's largest market outside of Europe.

On 3 February 2006, the company said that sales in the Middle East dried up completely, costing the company US$2 million a day. Soon after the boycott hit Arla's sales, the Danish government met with Muslim ambassadors and the newspaper issued an apology. Despite this, the boycott continued unabated for two months.

In March 2006, Arla took out full page advertising in Saudi Arabia, apologising for the cartoons and indicating Arla's respect for Islam in the country. This caused controversy in Denmark, where women's organisations and some politicians criticised Arla, and called on Danish women to boycott Arla's products in Denmark. In April 2006, the company said that its products were being placed back in shops in the Middle East.

Before the boycott, it supplied  shops in the area. It announced that many of its largest clients in Saudi Arabia would start selling its butter and cheese on 8 April 2006. At that time, Arla began sponsoring humanitarian causes in the Middle East to foster good public relations with the region.

Don’t Cancel the Cow campaign 
In 2022, Arla launched an advertising campaign called Don't Cancel the Cow claiming the rise of veganism among young people was the reason the dairy industry's future is uncertain. The campaign targets young people over their concern about the environmental impact of cows milk.

International Distribution

Indonesia
In Indonesia, Arla is distributed by Indofood, Pandurasa Kharisma, & Prambanan Kencana as joint venture and import company.

Malaysia
In Malaysia, Arla is distributed by Lamsoon who also distribute Lion Corporation products.

China
In China, Arla is distributed by Mengniu.

Japan
In Japan, Arla was once distributed by Morinaga Milk Industry. However, it is now distributed by various small companies.

Korea
In Korea, Arla is distributed by Maeil Dairies.

Egypt
In Egypt, Arla is distributed by Juhayna.

West Africa
In West Africa, Arla is distributed by Tolaram Group who also distribute Indomie, Nestle, and Colgate.

United States
In US, Arla is distributed by Dairy Farmers of America who also distribute Fromageries Bel.

Germany
In Germany, Arla is distributed by DMK Group.

United Kingdom
In the United Kingdom, Arla is distributed by Volac who also distribute Nestle, First Milk and Wilmar.

See also
 First Milk (company)
 List of companies of Sweden
 List of companies of Denmark

References

External links
 
 

 
Agricultural cooperatives
Companies based in Aarhus
Cooperatives in Denmark
Cooperatives in Sweden
Dairy products companies of Denmark
Dairy products companies of Sweden
Danish brands
Food and drink companies of Sweden
Food manufacturers of the United Kingdom
Food and drink companies established in 2000
2008 Chinese milk scandal
Multinational dairy companies
Multinational companies headquartered in Denmark
Multinational food companies
Purveyors to the Court of Sweden
Purveyors to the Court of Denmark
Danish companies established in 2000
Swedish brands